The 2015 Hong Kong Open Super Series was the twelfth Superseries tournament of the 2015 BWF Super Series. The tournament was contested in Kowloon, Hong Kong from November 17–22, 2015 with a total purse of $350,000. A qualification will occur to fill four places in all five disciplines of the main draws.

Men's singles

Seeds

Top half

Bottom half

Finals

Women's singles

Seeds

Top half

Bottom half

Finals

Men's doubles

Seeds

Top half

Bottom half

Finals

Women's doubles

Seeds

Top half

Bottom half

Finals

Mixed doubles

Seeds

Top half

Bottom half

Finals

References

External links
 Hong Kong Open at www.hkbadmintonassn.org.hk

Hong Kong Open (badminton)
Hong Kong Open Super Series
Hong Kong Open Super Series